Robert Newlyn (fl. 1421) of Bath, Somerset, was an English politician.

He was a Member (MP) of the Parliament of England for Bath in December 1421.

References

Year of birth missing
Year of death missing
English MPs December 1421
People from Bath, Somerset